Pozzoli is a surname. Notable people with the surname include:

Ettore Pozzoli (1873–1957), Italian classical pianist and composer
Silver Pozzoli (born 1953), Italian singer, songwriter, and musician

Italian-language surnames